Edgewater railway station is a railway station on the Transperth network. It is located on the Joondalup line, 23 kilometres from Perth station serving the suburb of Edgewater.

History
Edgewater station opened on 20 December 1992 in the median strip of the Mitchell Freeway.

In 2003, the contract for extending the platforms on seven Joondalup line stations, including Edgewater station, was awarded to Lakis Constructions. Along with the extensions, the platform edges were upgraded to bring them into line with tactile paving standards. Edgewater was the second station to begin being extended, with work commencing in December 2003. Work at this station was completed by April 2004.

In 2010, a new canopy replaced the original. In 2015, construction commenced on a $26 million multi-level car park. The car park consists of three levels, with 75 CCTV cameras, 445 lights, 3 duress buttons, as well a facade screening covering half the building. The car park opened on 22 January 2017, increasing the station's total parking capacity to more than 1450 bays.

Services
Edgewater station is served by Transperth Joondalup line services.

Edgewater station saw 530,906 passengers in the 2013–14 financial year.

Platforms
Platforms currently in use are as follows:

References

External links

Joondalup line
Railway stations in Perth, Western Australia
Railway stations in Australia opened in 1992
Transperth railway stations in highway medians